André Luís Volpe Miele (born 12 April 1987) (also spelled Andre Miele),  is a tennis player from Brazil. He was elected the best junior in Brazil in 2003. He and his partner Ricardo Hocevar won the 2009 Manta Open doubles championship.

ATP Challenger and ITF Futures finals

Singles: 20 (7–13)

Doubles: 63 (34–29)

References

External links

1987 births
Living people
Brazilian male tennis players
People from Ribeirão Preto
Sportspeople from São Paulo (state)
20th-century Brazilian people
21st-century Brazilian people